Loxostege venustalis is a moth in the family Crambidae. It was described by Stoll in 1781. It is found in Lesotho, Malawi, Mozambique, South Africa, Zambia and Zimbabwe.

References

Moths described in 1781
Moths of Africa
Pyraustinae
Taxa named by Caspar Stoll